The Agricultural Credit Cooperatives of Turkey (the ACC) is an agricultural cooperative founded by producers on the basis of mutual aid to protect their economic interests and to provide their subsistence and business related needs.  Established to benefit from the provisions of law number 1581 on Agricultural Credit Cooperatives and Unions, the Agricultural Credit Cooperatives of Turkey is a legal entity with replaceable members and capital.

History 
The foundation of the Agricultural Credit Cooperatives of Turkey dates back to 1863. The Turkish cooperative movement was started by  Midhat Pasha, governor of Niš (a city in Serbia which was Ottoman territory at the time), with the establishment of “Homeland Funds” (“Memleket Sandıkları”) in 1863 and it gained pace with the foundation of the Republic of Turkey as new laws on cooperatives were enacted. The ACC with its modern nomenclature and structure was established based on law number 2836 which was passed in 1935. The ACC’s foundation was supported by the first president of the Republic of Turkey Kemal Atatürk who was also the first member of the cooperative in Silifke – Tekir Çiftliği. 
Due to the enforcement of law number 1581 on Agricultural Credit Cooperatives and Unions in 1972, the ACC was able to form regional unions and a central union, which set the basis for a vertical organizational structure. The ACC operated under Türkiye Cumhuriyeti Ziraat Bankası (Agricultural Bank of the Republic of Turkey) until May 17, 1977, when the Central Union of Agricultural Credit Cooperatives of Turkey was officially opened. Since then Ziraat Bankası has had no managerial responsibilities towards the Agricultural Credit Cooperatives of Turkey, yet it has been acting as the ACC’s financing bank.

Even though the ACC went under the overall responsibilities of the Ministry of Food, Agriculture and Livestock for a decade (1985–1995), today it is an independent farmer organization which owes its current democratic structure to the law number 5330 enacted in 2005.

Organizational structure 
The Agricultural Credit Cooperatives of Turkey renders service to its 1.1 million members with 16 regional unions and 1625 cooperatives,  188 service offices and 7244 personnel.
Agricultural Credit Cooperatives of Turkey is managed by the Board of Directors elected by its members.

Regulations 
Law Number 1581 on Agricultural Credit Cooperatives and Unions.

Articles of Association 
Articles of Association of the Agricultural Credit Cooperatives of Turkey.

References 

Agricultural cooperatives
Agriculture in Turkey
Organizations established in 1863
Agricultural finance
Cooperatives in Turkey